Sergei Pavlovich Roldugin (Russian: Сергей Павлович Ролдугин, born September 28, 1951 Sakhalin) is a Russian cellist and businessman, based in St Petersburg. He is a close friend of Vladimir Putin. He has been implicated in several money laundering and offshore wealth schemes for Russian elites. Following the Russian invasion of Ukraine in 2022, the European Union sanctioned Roldugin.

Early life
Roldugin was born in Sakhalin where his father, a military man, was stationed. While he was young, his parents moved to Riga, Latvia, where he studied and became fluent in Latvian at Latvian School. He has relatives in Riga where his parents are buried.

Career
He was awarded the 1980 Prague Spring International Music Festival Competition's 3rd prize. In 1984 Roldugin was appointed the Kirov Opera Theatre Orchestra's principal cellist. He subsequently held a professorship at the Saint Petersburg Conservatory, where he served as the institution's rector from 2002-05. The Mariinsky Theatre Orchestra's Guest Conductor, he has been named a People's Artist of Russia.

Since the 1990s, Roldugin has been engaged in the oil and media business. He is known for having initiated the renovation of the decayed Alexis Palace as a music school and for having performed at the ruins of Palmyra a month after the site was reconquered from the ISIL. Roldugin plays the Stuart cello made by Antonio Stradivari in 1732; the instrument cost him $12 million.

Relationship with Vladimir Putin
Sergei Roldugin is a godfather to Maria Vorontsova (b. 1985), Vladimir Putin's older daughter. He has been friends with Putin since the late 1970s. In March 2016 The Guardian described Roldugin as "Putin's best friend". It was Roldugin who introduced Putin to Lyudmila, his future wife.

In connection with the Panama Papers, the Organized Crime and Corruption Reporting Project described Roldugin as the "secret caretaker" of Putin's hidden wealth through his participation in transactions with Mossack Fonseca and Dietrich, Baumgartner & Partner, who are Swiss lawyers in Zurich, to various offshore companies including Panama registered International Media Overseas, British Virgin Islands (BVI) registered Sonnette Overseas, Sunbarn Ltd and Sandalwood Continental, and the BVI registered Ove Financial Corp.

Wealth
In 2008 under Sergey Skvortsov's leadership, Troika Dialog spearheaded the alliance of AvtoVAZ-Renault-Nissan and the partnership among KAMAZ OJSC, Daimler AG Concern and Rostec. In early April 2008, Rubin Vandaryan stated that Troika Dialog through Avtoinvest and Kamaz-Capital had the controlling stake in KamAZ. Since 2008, Troika Dialog was the nominal owner of AvtoVAZ and KamAZ for the beneficial owner Sergei Roldugin.

Roldugin has maintained close financial ties with the Cyprus-based RCB Bank which is a subsidiary of VTB Bank, Yuri Kovalchuk of Rossiya Bank, Oleg Gordin who owns Sandalwood Continental as the legal representative of Roldugin through Roldugin's sole ownership of International Media Overseas and is a St Petersburg businessman with Rossiya Bank, Aleksander Plekhov who owns Sunbarn Ltd as the legal representative of Roldugin through Roldugin's sole ownership of Sonnette Overseas and is a St Petersburg businessman with Rossiya Bank, Yevgeny Malov who is a partner of Gennady Timchenko and one of the founders of the oil trader Gunvor, the Rotenberg family (Arkady, Igor, and Boris), Suleyman Kerimov, Alexei Mordashov, and other Russian oligarchs.

Established by Mikhail Lesin, Video International (VI) is one of Russia's largest television advertising firms which Roldugin has a large stake through the Cyprus-based Med Media Network which is solely owned by Roldugin's International Media Overseas.

In March 2019, Roldugin was implicated in a nearly $9 billion global money laundering scheme allegedly constructed by Sberbank CIB (formerly known as "Troika Dialog"), in which Roldugin received $69 million. The money laundering scheme is known as ŪkioLeaks or the Troika Laundromat.

2016 United States elections hacking
According to Andrei Soldatov, the 3 April 2016 release of the Panama Papers, which is known in Russia as OffshoreGate, and, in particular, information about Roldugin's nearly $2 billion in assets, which are closely associated with Vladimir Putin's assets, directly led to a quid pro quo or a tit for tat with Putin ordering hacks of Hillary Clinton, her party and others to support Donald Trump's 2016 Presidential campaign and his party. Dmitri Alperovitch, one of the founders of CrowdStrike, stated, "They ([hackers]) cast a wide net without knowing in advance what the benefit might be," and Andrei Soldatov said, "It was a series of tactical operations. At each moment, the people who were doing this [hacking] were filled with excitement over how well it was going, and that success pushed them to go even further."

Sanctions
After Russia's 2022 invasion of Ukraine, the European Union sanctioned Roldugin.

Personal life
Roldugin's first spouse was Irina Nikitina, President of the Musical Olympus Foundation. His current spouse is Elena Mirtova (opera singer, soprano).

Yevgeny Roldugin
Yevgeny Roldugin, Segei Roldugin's older brother, attended the KGB training school with Putin in the 1970s and later returned to the Latvian SSR and worked as KGB. On 15 November 2020, Yevgeny Roldugin died from COVID-19 in Riga, Latvia. In Riga, Yevgeny had been head of Gazprom in Latvia since 6 April 2009 when Gazprom opened its Latvian office. Previously, he was at Latvijas Gaze as head of the industrial safety and labor protection department.

Notes

References

External links
 A photograph of Roldugin
 Mariinsky Theatre
 Maestro Temirkanov International Foundation for Cultural Initiatives
 Ludwig van Beethoven Association in Poland
 

Latvian classical cellists
Russian classical cellists
People's Artists of Russia
1951 births
Living people
Musicians from Riga
Soviet classical cellists
Academic staff of Saint Petersburg Conservatory
People named in the Panama Papers
Russian individuals subject to European Union sanctions